Come Go with Me is the debut studio album released by Gloria Jones in 1966. The album is available in mono and stereo versions. "The New 'Heartbeat' Sound That Never Quits".

It is from this period with Ed Cobb that also produced "Tainted Love" and "My Bad Boy's Coming Home." Both songs were later given an album release on 1982's Reunited, once again with Ed Cobb producing.   This album has yet to be given an official CD release.

Track listing

Personnel 
Credits adapted from the liner notes of Come Go with Me.
Ed Cobb – production 
Lincoln Mayorga – arrangement
Tom May – engineering
Allen B. Jacobs, Herbert S. Cohen, A. Ross, Rahni Harris – production consultants 
George Jerman – photography

References 

Gloria Jones albums
1966 debut albums
Uptown Records albums
Albums produced by Ed Cobb